Filippo Corsini (1873–1926) was an Italian Liberal Party politician. He was Marquess of Lajatico, Province of Pisa, Tuscany. He was the 11th mayor of Florence, Kingdom of Italy.

References

1873 births
1926 deaths
19th-century Italian politicians
20th-century Italian politicians
Mayors of Florence